Following the release of We Can't Dance, Genesis spent 13 weeks performing 55 concerts between May and July 1992, with a 16-date UK tour in October/November.

Background
The popular worldwide tour sold out arenas and stadiums (where they played on the U.S. leg of the tour). This proved to be Collins's last tour with Genesis until the band reunited in 2007. The album was re-released as a SACD/DVD double disc set (including new 5.1 and Stereo mixes) in October 2007. During the recording of We Can't Dance a 40-minute documentary called No Admittance was produced and broadcast on the Disney Channel. It has since been included in the bonus DVD released in 2007.

The "We Can't Dance" tour featured shows in large arenas and stadiums throughout North America and Europe. It would be the band's final full-length tour until the 2007 Turn It On Again reunion tour. The tour is captured live on the albums The Way We Walk, Volume One: The Shorts, The Way We Walk, Volume Two: The Longs and the concert video The Way We Walk - Live in Concert.

Setlist
This set list is an average for the tour and it contains every song that they played on the tour. Songs that were only played occasionally are noted down.
"Land of Confusion"
"No Son of Mine"
"Driving the Last Spike"
"Old Medley" (including some short excerpts from "That's All", "Illegal Alien", "Misunderstanding" (or "Your Own Special Way"), "Follow You Follow Me" and "Stagnation")1. "Dance on a Volcano"2. "The Lamb Lies Down On Broadway"3. "The Musical Box"4. "Firth of Fifth"5. "I Know What I Like (In Your Wardrobe)"
"Throwing It All Away" (eliminated after August 2, but was performed twice on the third and final leg of the tour)
"Fading Lights"
"Jesus He Knows Me"
"Carpet Crawlers" (only performed on October 23)
"Dreaming While You Sleep" (only performed from May 8 - June 25 and October 28 - November 15)
"Home by the Sea"
"Second Home by the Sea"
"Hold on My Heart"
"Mama" (dropped after May 28)
"Domino"
"Drum Duet"
"I Can't Dance"
Encore

 "Tonight, Tonight, Tonight" (first three verses with first three choruses)/"Invisible Touch" (full song)
 "Turn It On Again"

Rehearsal Songs (not played on tour)
Way of the World
Living Forever

Tour dates

Personnel
Genesis
Phil Collins – lead vocals, drums, percussion
Tony Banks – keyboards, backing vocals
Mike Rutherford – guitars, bass, backing vocals
Additional Musicians
Daryl Stuermer – bass, guitar, backing vocals
Chester Thompson – drums, percussion

Notes

References

Genesis (band) concert tours
1992 concert tours